Athamania is an Aromanian (Vlach) village and a community of the Pyli municipality. Before the 2011 local government reform it was part of the municipality Aithikes, of which it was a municipal district. The 2011 census recorded 5 residents in the village. The community of Athamania covers an area of 27.802 km2.

Geography
Athamania lies on the border between Thessaly and Epirus. It is located below mountain Kakarditsa (2,450m), which is the highest top of the Tzoumerka mountain range.

Sightseeings and festivals
Athamania has some remarkable and very important monuments like the churches of Saint Paraskevi, the Saviour, Saint Athanasios, Prophet Elias, the Saint Apostles and Saint John the Forerunner. Many festivals of various types take place in Athamania. The traditional festival of Saint Paraskevi is the most significant summer celebration.

See also
List of settlements in the Trikala regional unit

References

Populated places in Trikala (regional unit)
Aromanian settlements in Greece